Crambione cooki is a rare species of jellyfish in the family Catostylidae. After its original discovery and description in 1910 by Alfred Gainsborough Mayer, it was later presumed extinct, until 2013 when it was sighted off the Australian coast in Queensland. Crambione cooki was originally described as having a bell diameter of 11 centimeters and arms approximately 27cm long.

References

Notes

Further reading 
 Excitement builds after extraordinary marine discovery – ABC News (Australian Broadcasting Corporation)
A sting in the tail as jellyfish believed extinct turns up 103 YEARS after last sighting – Mirror Online

Catostylidae